Voigtländer was a significant long-established company within the optics and photographic industry, headquartered in Braunschweig, Germany, and today continues as a trademark for a range of photographic products.

History 
Voigtländer produced mathematical instruments, precision mechanical products, optical instruments, including optical measuring instruments and opera glasses, and is the oldest name in cameras.

Early beginnings 
Johann Christoph Voigtländer (November 19, 1732 in Leipzig – June 27, 1797 in Vienna), the son of a carpenter, came to Prague in 1755, and to Vienna in the same year, and worked from 1757 to 1762 in the workshop of Meinicke, who produced mathematical instruments.

Through Johann Voigtländer's skilful achievements, the Minister of State of the Habsburg monarchy—Prince Wenzel von Kaunitz, drew attention to Voigtländer and Empress Maria Theresa of Austria granted Voigtländer in 1763 a so-called trade "Protection Decree" (German Schutzdekret/Schutzdecret): "on the making of mathematical instruments and on an unspecified number of workers", upon which Voigtländer founded his own workshop and whereby he could sell his products relatively unrivalled.

In 1767, Voigtländer invented two important tools: a linear device for natural and tapered gauges, and a circular device for elevation, astrolabe, and cartography etc., including, a screw cutting machine, a metal lathe and finishing rollers for sheep wool and silk factories. The production program was supplemented by compasses, tweezers, levelling devices, dioptres and other fine mechanical products.

In recognition of his achievements and dexterity, Voigtländer received in 1797 a so-called "national commercial license with all advantages and privileges" (German Landesfabriksbefugnis); this license awarded Voigtländer under certain circumstances the prestige to display the imperial eagle of the Habsburg monarchy, but above all the right to establish branch sales offices in all major cities of the empire. In the same year, Voigtländer died, and his successful family business was continued by his widow, their three sons and one daughter.

From 1840, Voigtländer's grandson  established Voigtländer as a leading photographic company of its time on introducing and producing the Petzval objective lens.

Photography optics and cameras 

From 1839, the year, when the invention of photography was being published, came objective optics and from 1840 complete cameras for photography. The Voigtländer objectives were revolutionary because they were the first mathematically calculated precision objectives in the history of photography, developed by the German-Hungarian mathematics professor Josef Maximilian Petzval, with technical advice provided by Peter Voigtländer. Voigtländer went on to produce the first Petzval portrait photographic lens (the fastest lens at that time: f/3.6) in 1840, and the world's first all-metal daguerreotype camera (Ganzmetallkamera) in 1840, also bringing out photographic plate cameras shortly afterwards. An original of the 1840 all-metal daguerreotype camera with "No. 84 Voigtländer & Sohn in Vienna" is exhibited in the "Deutsches Museum" in Munich.

In 1845, Peter Voigtländer married the daughter of a respected Braunschweig lawyer, whom he met on one of his photographic sales journeys in Braunschweig. Voigtländer had previously set up a branch sales office in Braunschweig, Duchy of Brunswick, at that time the central hub in the German rail network. Compared to Vienna, Braunschweig offered a location advantage regarding the distribution of Voigtländer objectives and daguerreotype camera products due to the greater proximity to the German overseas ports.

During the rising social and political tensions in the Austrian Empire leading to the Revolutions of 1848, Peter Voigtländer had joined the political cause of the Democrats and also became adjutant to the commander of the Vienna national civil guard—General . As the revolutions escalated during the Vienna Uprising of October 1848, the counter-revolution had strengthened with full force, and General Messenhauser of the revolting national civil guard, like many others—were executed. Voigtländer at that time had in perception of the power relations withdrawn from the Vienna national civil guard and with his family took refuge in a suburb of Vienna. On the wishes of Peter Voigtländer's wife and when the March revolutions of 1848 hindered the further development of the young photographic company, the family promptly re-located from Vienna to his wife's hometown Braunschweig, where from 1849 Voigtländer established a subsidiary production site, granted on a provisional "Concession for the pursuit of a trade", issued by the city directorate with a term of five years. In September 1852, Peter Voigtländer was successfully awarded a so-called "land-cooperative" (German Markgenossenschaft) and issued the desired unrestricted "Concession for the pursuit of a trade" in the city Braunschweig. In 1864, Peter Voigtländer was honoured by Emperor Franz Joseph I of Austria with the Knight's Cross of the Order of Franz Joseph; becoming known as Peter Wilhelm Friedrich Ritter von Voigtländer. On the death of Voigtländer's Vienna works manager, the Vienna business was closed in 1868. Voigtländer Braunschweig changed status to a public Aktiengesellschaft (Voigtländer & Sohn AG) in 1898. In 1923 a majority of the shares (99.7%) were acquired by Schering AG's photo division and large-scale production then took place in 1925.

Over the next three decades, Voigtländer became a technology leader and the first manufacturer to introduce several new kinds of product that later became commonplace. These include the first zoom lens for 35 mm still photography (36–82/2.8 Zoomar) in 1959 and the first 35 mm compact camera with built-in electronic flash (Vitrona) in 1965.

Schering sold its share of the company to the Carl Zeiss Foundation in 1956, and Zeiss-Ikon and Voigtländer-Vertriebsgesellschaft integrated in 1965. Due to falling sales, on 4 August 1971 Zeiss-Ikon/Voigtländer-Vertriebsgesellschaft ended producing cameras and closed the Voigtländer factory, which employed at the time 2,037 persons. Subsequently, the company moved to the collective enterprise Optische Werke Voigtländer (Optical Works Voigtländer), in which Carl Zeiss AG, the state of Lower Saxony and the Braunschweig camera manufacturer Rollei each participated to one-third; Later Rollei took over all the shares. On the collapse of Rollei in 1982, Plusfoto took over the name, selling it in 1997 to Ringfoto.

Contemporary times 
Since 1999, Voigtländer-branded products have been manufactured and marketed by the Japanese optics and camera company Cosina, under license from Ringfoto GmbH & Co. ALFO Marketing KG; for these, see Cosina Voigtländer.

Lenses 

Below is a list of original Voigtländer lens designs (in all variants).
 Voigtar, a three element lens.
 Vaskar
 Helomar
 Skopar, Skoparex, Skoparet, Skopagon, Color-Skopar, Color-Skopar X. The basic Skopar is a 4 element Tessar type lens.
 Heliar, The Heliar was made over many years, and was usually a 5 element lens, the 75 mm versions were of a 6 element design. The 125 mm version actually had 11 elements.
 Dynarex, Dynaret, Color-Dynarex, Super-Dynarex, Super-Dynaret
 Septon
 Color-Lanthar
 Color-Ultron
 Zoomar, usually reckoned to be the first zoom lens specifically designed for a 35 mm "still" camera.
 Nokton, Super Nokton
 Apo Lanthar

Models 

 Bessamatic series
 Brillant/Brilliant
 Vitomatic
 Ultramatic series

References

Further reading

External links 

 Voigtländer Heliar Lens Article
 http://www.voigtlaender.com/
 Voigtländer Historical Lenses
 Complete list of all Voigtländer cameras and their images
 

 
Photography companies of Germany
Lens manufacturers
Companies based in Braunschweig